Kim Jong-soo may refer to:

Augustinus Kim Jong-soo (born 1956), South Korean Catholic prelate
Kim Jong-soo (actor) (born 1964), South Korean actor
Kim Jong-soo (footballer) (born 1986), South Korean footballer

See also